Abdollah Movahed  (born March 20, 1940) is a retired Iranian lightweight freestyle wrestler. He competed at the 1964, 1968 and 1972 Olympics and won a gold medal in 1968. He served as flag bearer for Iran at the Opening Ceremony of the 1970 Asian Games, and won a gold medal a few days later.

Family
Movahed's father was a teacher who moved from Ardabil to Babolsar during the reign of Reza Shah. He later changed his name from Mojtaba Fazlizadeh to Mojtaba Movahed Ardebili, and married a woman from Bandar-e Anzali. They had three daughters and six sons, first being born in 1926. Mojtaba died in 1944, and the elder brothers became heads of the family and looked after young Abdollah. Around 1957, they moved the family to Tehran.

Sports career
While living in Babolsar Movahed trained in gymnastics, volleyball and swimming. In Tehran he continued playing volleyball and took up weightlifting, but stopped due to a bout of hepatitis. After recovering he changed to wrestling upon advice from his brother Mehdi. Abdollah began competing in 1959, and next year participated in the Iranian Olympic Trials. Coaches soon noted Movahed's technical prowess, and believed that with the proper conditioning, he had the potential to be a world champion. Their suspicions were confirmed: between 1965 and 1970 Movahed won every major contest that he entered.

The highlight of his career was the 1968 Olympics in Mexico, where he won the gold medal. At the 1972 Games he injured his shoulder in the early rounds, and did not advance to the final. Movahed later moved to the United States, but refused to train American wrestlers because they might face Iranian opponents in international tournaments. He was inducted into the FILA wrestling hall of fame. He lives in the USA city of Fairfax, Virginia.

References

External links 
 

1940 births
Living people
Olympic wrestlers of Iran
Wrestlers at the 1964 Summer Olympics
Wrestlers at the 1968 Summer Olympics
Wrestlers at the 1972 Summer Olympics
Iranian male sport wrestlers
Medalists at the 1968 Summer Olympics
Olympic gold medalists for Iran
Place of birth missing (living people)
Asian Games gold medalists for Iran
Olympic medalists in wrestling
Asian Games medalists in wrestling
People from Babolsar
Wrestlers at the 1966 Asian Games
Wrestlers at the 1970 Asian Games
World Wrestling Champions
Medalists at the 1966 Asian Games
Medalists at the 1970 Asian Games
Sportspeople from Mazandaran province
20th-century Iranian people
21st-century Iranian people